Castianeira longipalpa is a species of true spider in the family Corinnidae. It is found in the United States as well as Canada. It is a type of ant-mimic sac spider, and has most often been observed along the east coast of North America.

References

External links

 

Corinnidae
Articles created by Qbugbot
Spiders described in 1847